Death Spa is a 1988 American supernatural slasher film directed by Michael Fischa and starring William Bumiller, Brenda Bakke, Merritt Butrick, Ken Foree, Karyn Parsons, Rosalind Cash, and Vanessa Bell Calloway. Its plot follows a series of mysterious deaths occurring in a high-tech Los Angeles health spa, resulting from the spirit of the owner's deceased wife, who possesses the club's intricate computer system.

In Europe and Asia, the film was released under the alternative title Witch Bitch. 

Butrick's role in the film was his last before his death, while Parsons's role marked her feature film debut as an actress.

Plot
After closing hours in the Starbody Health Spa in Los Angeles, Laura Danvers is mysteriously locked inside the sauna, which fills with chlorine gas, inducing chemical burns on her skin and eyes, nearly killing her. Her boyfriend Michael Evans—the club owner whose wife Catherine committed suicide the previous year—is notified and rushes to the hospital. The club features a state-of-the-art computer system which controls its various workout machines and other features, and is managed by David, Catherine's twin brother.

Los Angeles Police Department detectives Sergeant Stone and Lt. Fletcher arrive at Starbody to investigate Laura's accident. Shortly after, club patron Darla is nearly injured when the bolts holding the pool's diving board break loose. Later, Robert is brutally killed when a weightlifting machine malfunctions, tearing him apart at his limbs. Marci Hewitt, another patron, is brutally killed in the locker room by a spear, but her body disappears and she is regarded as a missing person. Michael brings Laura, still wearing bandages over her injured eyes, to the spa. There, Darla, the club manager, plays a prank on them by dressing as Catherine in a zombie mask.

Troubled by nightmares and visions of Catherine, Michael visits Dr. Lido Moray, a parapsychologist, for answers regarding the strange incidents at the club. Moray uses psychometry on an object owned by Catherine, and divulges details to Michael about Catherine's life, including her paralysis after a traumatic childbirth in which the infant died, her subsequent depression and jealousy of Michael, and apparent suicide by self-immolation. Michael is skeptical ofMoray's reading, believing he may have obtained the information from newspaper articles about Catherine's death.

Later, patron Linda is lured to the spa basement where she is doused with acid as an apparition of Catherine looks on. Meanwhile, David visits the recuperating Laura—still wearing eye patches, rendering her unable to see—while she alone at David's house. Moray arrives at the spa under the guise of an insurance investigator, and finds Linda in the basement, her flesh decimated and barely alive. He is confronted by an apparition of Catherine, who brutally murders him. The next day, Michael visits his lawyer Tom to return his wristwatch, which Michael found in the computer control room. Priscilla, who is having an affair with Tom, is accused by Michael of sabotaging the club, but she denies it; Tom, however, is revealed to be vying to take ownership of the club.

Michael appoints instructors Marvin and Jeffrey to secure the club's computer room and keep David away. Stone and Fletcher discover that David has been hacking into the club computer system from his home, and suspect David may be cross-dressing as Catherine. That evening, a Mardi Gras party is held at the club. Catherine appears to infiltrate the room and kill Jeffrey before donning his mask and costume and wandering through the party. Catherine, revealed to be a vengeful ghost possessing David's body and manifesting in her living form, kidnaps Laura before binding and gagging her and attempting to kill her using the club's high-powered tanning bed. Catherine terrorizes the partygoers from the control room, shapeshifting in front of Michael's eyes.

Catherine, using psychokinetic powers, causes staff member Rhonda to lose her hand in a blender accident, causing her to bleed to death; Fletcher is killed by a fish in a food freezer, and Priscilla falls victim to spontaneous human combustion. The partygoers attempt to flee in the melee, many dying in the process, while Catherine uses the computer system to lock the club. Michael intentionally fries the club's computer system using the fuse box, burning the still-possessed David's alive.

Cast

Production
According to director Michael Fischa, "the health craze had blossomed in LA. [Health clubs] came up like mushrooms. So quickly that they went out of business. So we thought, basically, we turn it around and we have a ghost in our health club. That could be a fun scenario".

Release
The film was given a limited release in the United States in July 1988.

Home media
The film was released in Japan in 1989 on video, before being released to VHS in the United States in 1990. It was released on a Blu-ray/DVD combo pack in 2014.

Legacy
In 2014, Death Spa was featured on an episode of Red Letter Media's "Best of the Worst" along with High Voltage and Space Mutiny.

In 2015, Death Spa was featured on an episode of the popular podcast How Did This Get Made?, featuring Horatio Sanz as the guest. They ridiculed several aspects of the film, such as the 80's workout gear, the paranormal-transgender villains, and whether or not serving sushi in a place of exercise is sanitary.

Actress Karyn Parsons made her screen debut in Death Spa, and was subsequently brought in to audition for The Fresh Prince of Bel-Air after an NBC executive saw the movie on late-nite cable.

Notes

References

Sources

External links

1988 films
1988 direct-to-video films
1988 horror films
American horror films
American slasher films
American supernatural horror films
Films about computer hacking
Films about paraplegics or quadriplegics
Films about spirit possession
Films about twins
Films directed by Michael Fischa
Films set in Los Angeles
Films shot in Los Angeles
Supernatural slasher films
Techno-horror films
1980s English-language films
1980s slasher films